Viviane Lapointe is a Canadian politician, who was elected to the Canadian House of Commons in the 2021 Canadian federal election. She represents the electoral district of Sudbury as a member of the Liberal Party of Canada.

Biography 
Lapointe was born in Elliot Lake, Ontario, where her father was a miner. She later moved to the New Sudbury neighbourhood, where she grew up, graduating from École secondaire Macdonald-Cartier.

She worked for the Ministry of Northern Development and Mines before later becoming executive director of Community Living Greater Sudbury.

In June 2021, she announced her intention to seek the Liberal Party of Canada nomination for the 2021 Canadian federal election, seeking to replace outgoing Liberal MP Paul Lefebvre. After successfully winning the nomination over Cinéfest Sudbury International Film Festival director Tammy Frick, she went on to win her riding in the 2021 election with 34 per cent of the vote.

Committees 

 INDU Standing Committee on Industry and Technology
 RNNR Standing Committee on Natural Resources

Electoral record

Sudbury

References

External links

 Viviane Lapointe – Parliament of Canada biography

Members of the House of Commons of Canada from Ontario
Liberal Party of Canada MPs
People from Elliot Lake
Franco-Ontarian people
Living people
Women members of the House of Commons of Canada
Politicians from Greater Sudbury
21st-century Canadian politicians
21st-century Canadian women politicians
Year of birth missing (living people)
Women in Ontario politics